The Men's time trial C1 road cycling event at the 2016 Summer Paralympics took place on 14 September at Flamengo Park, Pontal. Nine riders from eight nations competed.

The C1 category is for cyclists with upper or lower limb disabilities and most severe neurological dysfunction.

Results

References

External links
 Final Results

Men's road time trial C1